Domingo García is a municipality located in the province of Segovia, Castile and León, Spain. According to the 2004 census (INE), the municipality has a population of 50 inhabitants, being a very small municipality.
It has a lot of old houses and an old church.

References

Municipalities in the Province of Segovia